Edmond Bruce (September 28, 1899 – November 28, 1973) was an American radio pioneer best known for creating the rhombic antenna and Bruce array.

Bruce was born in Saint Louis, Missouri, and raised in Cambridge, Massachusetts, Brooklyn, and Washington, D.C. In 1917 he left high school to join the Navy and was eventually chief radio electrician in the transatlantic communication service, serving at the Otter Cliffs Radio Station in Bar Harbor, Maine. He then studied at George Washington University, 1919, and at Massachusetts Institute of Technology, 1920–1924, from which he received his bachelor's degree in electrical communication. From 1921 to 1923 he also worked for Melville Eastham's Clapp-Eastham Company.

In 1924 he joined the Western Electric Company, and in 1925 became a research engineer at Bell Telephone Laboratories, where he helped develop short-wave radio receivers and field strength measuring equipment, and designed directional antennas for short-wave radio communication, including his celebrated rhombic antenna (1931). Karl Jansky used a steerable Bruce array in his earliest radio astronomy experiments, also in 1931.

Bruce received the 1932 IEEE Morris N. Liebmann Memorial Award "for his theoretical investigations and field developments in the domain of directional antennas", and the Franklin Institute's 1935 Longstreth Award for inventing the rhombic antenna.

Patents
Patent 2,285,565

Selected works 
  Bruce, E., Beck, A.C., Lowry, L.R., "Horizontal Rhombic Antennas", Proceedings of the IRE, volume 23, issue 1, Jan. 1935, pages 24–46.

References 
 Proceedings of the IRE, 1932
 Author biograph, Proceedings of the Institute of Radio Engineers, Volume 23, Number 1. January 1935.
 Genealogical record

Radio pioneers
Scientists at Bell Labs
1973 deaths
1899 births